Louco Amor is a Brazilian telenovela produced and broadcast by TV Globo. It premiered on 11 April 1983 and ended on 21 October 1983, with a total of 167 episodes. It's the thirtieth "novela das oito" to be aired on the timeslot. It is created and written by Gilberto Braga and directed by Wolf Maya.

Cast

References

External links 
 

TV Globo telenovelas
1983 telenovelas
Brazilian telenovelas
1983 Brazilian television series debuts
1983 Brazilian television series endings
Telenovelas by Gilberto Braga
Portuguese-language telenovelas